Le Charivari was an illustrated magazine published in Paris, France, from 1832 to 1937.  It published caricatures, political cartoons and reviews. After 1835, when  the government banned political caricature, Le Charivari began publishing satires of everyday life.  The name refers to the folk practice of holding a charivari, a loud, riotous parade, to shame or punish wrongdoers.

History and profile
Le Charivari was started by caricaturist Charles Philipon and his brother-in-law Gabriel Aubert to reduce their financial risk of censorship fines. They also had published the satirical, anti-monarchist, illustrated newspaper La Caricature, which had more pages and was printed on more expensive paper.  In Le Charivari, they featured humorous content which was not so political. Ownership of the paper changed often due to issues with government censorship, and related taxes and fines.

Le Charivari published daily from 1832 to 1936, and then weekly until 1937.

In 1841, British wood-engraver Ebenezer Landells, together with Henry Mayhew, used Le Charivari as the model to establish their Punch magazine, subtitled The London Charivari.

Selected contributing artists
Contributing with lithographs, woodcuts, and (after 1870) with zincographies (gillotage) were:
Cham (Amédée de Noé)
Honoré Daumier
Alexandre-Gabriel Decamps
Achille Devéria
Gustave Doré
Eugène Forest
Paul Gavarni
André Gill
Alfred Grévin
Grandville (Jean-Ignace-Isidore Gérard)
Paul Hadol
Alfred Le Petit
Maurice Loutreuil
Henry Monnier
Louis Touchagues
Gaspard-Félix Tournachon, known as Nadar
Charles-Joseph Traviès de Villers, known as Traviès

Selected contributing writers
Louis Desnoyers
Louis Leroy
Henri Rochefort
Agénor Altaroche
Philibert Audebrand
Charles Bataille
Clément Caraguel
Albert Cler
Taxile Delord
Louis Adrien Huart
Jaime
Henry Maret

Illustrations in Le Charivari

References

External links
 , refers to Charivari.
 .
Daumier Drawings, an exhibition catalog from The Metropolitan Museum of Art (fully available online as PDF), which contains material on Le Charivari (see index)

1832 establishments in France
1937 disestablishments in France
Caricature
Defunct magazines published in France
French-language magazines
Magazines established in 1832
Magazines disestablished in 1937
Magazines published in Paris
Satirical magazines published in France
Weekly magazines published in France